Bridgman is a lunar impact crater that is located on the far side of the Moon. It lies in the northern hemisphere, to the northwest of the crater Kurchatov. To the west-southwest is the old formation Becquerel, and eastward are the craters Pawsey and Wiener.

The prominent outer wall of Bridgman is only somewhat worn, and retains much of its original detail including traces of terrace structures and slumping. The rim is not quite circular, having a slight polygonal appearance with rounded corners. There is a notable inward bulge of the wall at the south end. The interior floor is generally level, with a central peak formation at the midpoint.

Satellite craters
By convention these features are identified on lunar maps by placing the letter on the side of the crater midpoint that is closest to Bridgman.

References

External links
 

Impact craters on the Moon